The Waterous Engine Works was a famous Canadian farm and road engine builder. It made farm, road rollers and steam pumper fire equipment. It also made factory steam engines and marine engines. Many of their engines survive to this day in museums.

See also 

 Bell Telephone Memorial

References 

 Waterous, Brantford Public Library
 Waterous Company History
  WATEROUS (Waterhouse), CHARLES HORATIO (biography), Biography Canada webpage 
 Firehall Museum

Manufacturing companies of Canada
Firefighting equipment